A Brief History of Time is a 1991 biographical documentary film about the physicist Stephen Hawking, directed by Errol Morris. The title derives from Hawking's bestselling 1988 book A Brief History of Time, but, whereas the book is solely an explanation of cosmology, the film is also a biography of Hawking, featuring interviews with some of his family members and colleagues. The music is by frequent Morris collaborator Philip Glass.

Production
This film project originated with executive producer Gordon Freedman, who brought the project to Anglia Television as a co-producer. After acquiring the property, Freedman met with director Steven Spielberg for advice on how to make the project into an important documentary film. Spielberg suggested Errol Morris as director. Morris had studied the history and philosophy of science at Princeton and later Berkeley, so was familiar with many of the topics in Hawking's book. Freedman's production company partnered with Anglia Television and Tokyo Broadcasting. David Hickman, of Anglia, became the film's producer.

Morris only had a few days of access to film and interview Hawking. Because of Hawking's ALS, a disease that progressively affects nerve cells within the spine and brain, Morris filmed various static shots of Hawking, his wheelchair, and the tools he used to communicate, such as his battery-powered computer-based communication system with an electronic voicebox (which was sponsored and provided by Intel Corporation), to later edit together for the video component of Hawking's interview segments in the film.

Although Hawking had an aversion to featuring his personal life in the film, Morris saw A Brief History of Time as being as much a biography as a science text, and much of his directing and editing work was dedicated to finding ways to depict ideas from theoretical physics and cosmology and then connect those ideas with details from the life of Hawking. He employed stylized interview sequences, graphic illustrations, and music written by Philip Glass. Morris also included clips from Disney's The Black Hole (1979).

Instead of Morris traveling around and filming the various interview subjects in their native surroundings, all of the interviews for this film were shot on specially built sets on a sound stage in England. Morris said he was "very moved by Hawking as a man", calling him "immensely likable, perverse, funny...and yes, he's a genius."[1] He remembers that Hawking had posters of Marilyn Monroe in his office, and one of them fell down while they were filming. "A fallen woman", Hawking's speech synthesizer intoned. Hawking's mother, Isobel, is the first person we hear from in the movie, and near the end she describes her son as "a seeker" for truth. After the movie premiered, Hawking told Morris, "Thank you for making my mother a star."

List of interviewees 
(in order of appearance)

Isobel Hawking, Hawking's mother

Janet Humphrey, Hawking's aunt

Mary Hawking, Hawking's sister

Basil King, neighbor of the Hawkings

Derek Powney, classmate of Hawking at Oxford

Norman Dix, classmate of Hawking at Oxford

Robert Berman, tutor of Hawking at Oxford

Gordon Berry, classmate of Hawking at Oxford

Roger Penrose, mathematical physicist who worked with Hawking on Penrose-Hawking singularity theorems

Dennis Sciama, cosmologist and PhD supervisor for Hawking

John Wheeler, theoretical physicist who coined the phrase "black hole"

Brandon Carter, physicist

John Taylor, physicist

Kip Thorne, astrophysicist and friend of Hawking

Don Page, theoretical physicist, doctoral student of Hawking

Christopher Isham, physicist

Brian Whitt, physicist and editor of Hawking's A Brief History of Time

Raymond Laflamme, theoretical physicist, doctoral student of Hawking

Music
The soundtrack for A Brief History of Time was composed by Philip Glass. Morris says he had Glass compose the score before showing him the movie; instead, he would give him relevant cues like "Falling into a black hole" or "Event horizon." Glass's score has been described as "hypnotic."

Soundtrack

Reception
A Brief History of Time received largely positive reviews. On review aggregator website Rotten Tomatoes, the film holds a 93% rating based on 15 reviews. On Metacritic, the film has a 78 out of 100 rating based on 12 critics, indicating "generally favorable reviews".

Availability
The film was released on VHS in the early 1990s, but remained unreleased on DVD or Blu-ray until The Criterion Collection issued a release on April 15, 2014.

References

External links
 
 
 
 
 A Brief History of Time from ErrolMorris.com
A Brief History of Time: Macrobiography an essay by David Sterritt at the Criterion Collection

1991 films
Films with atheism-related themes
1990s biographical films
1991 documentary films
American biographical films
American documentary films
Biographical films about mathematicians
British biographical films
British documentary films
Japanese biographical films
Japanese documentary films
Biographical documentary films
Documentary films about mathematics
Documentary films about science
Films shot at EMI-Elstree Studios
Films scored by Philip Glass
Films directed by Errol Morris
Films shot in Cambridgeshire
Films shot in Hertfordshire
Stephen Hawking
1990s English-language films
1990s American films
1990s British films
1990s Japanese films